Anne Merete Grosvold (born 7 September 1950) is a Norwegian journalist, working for the Norwegian Broadcasting Corporation (NRK). She has been correspondent for NRK in Beijing, been talk show hostess, and hosted the current events programs Redaksjon 21 and Dagsnytt 18. She was awarded Den Store Journalistprisen by the Norwegian Press Association in 1998.

References

1950 births
Living people
NRK people
Norwegian television presenters
Norwegian women television presenters
Norwegian television news anchors
Norwegian television reporters and correspondents
Norwegian expatriates in China